Whooping cough, also known as pertussis or the 100-day cough, is a highly contagious bacterial disease. Initial symptoms are usually similar to those of the common cold with a runny nose, fever, and mild cough, but these are followed by two or three months of severe coughing fits. Following a fit of coughing, a high-pitched whoop sound or gasp may occur as the person breathes in. The violent coughing may last for 10 or more weeks, hence the phrase "100-day cough". A person may cough so hard that they vomit, break ribs, or become very tired from the effort. Children less than one year old may have little or no cough and instead have periods where they cannot breathe. The time between infection and the onset of symptoms is usually seven to ten days. Disease may occur in those who have been vaccinated, but symptoms are typically milder.

Pertussis is caused by the bacterium Bordetella pertussis. It is spread easily through the coughs and sneezes of an infected person. People are infectious from the start of symptoms until about three weeks into the coughing fits. Those treated with antibiotics are no longer infectious after five days. Diagnosis is by collecting a sample from the back of the nose and throat. This sample can then be tested by either culture or by polymerase chain reaction.

Prevention is mainly by vaccination with the pertussis vaccine. Initial immunization is recommended between six and eight weeks of age, with four doses to be given in the first two years of life. Protection from pertussis decreases over time, so additional doses of vaccine are often recommended for older children and adults. Vaccination during pregnancy is highly effective at protecting the infant from pertussis during their vulnerable early months of life, and is recommended in many countries. Antibiotics may be used to prevent the disease in those who have been exposed and are at risk of severe disease. In those with the disease, antibiotics are useful if started within three weeks of the initial symptoms, but otherwise have little effect in most people. In pregnant women and children less than one year old, antibiotics are recommended within six weeks of symptom onset. Antibiotics used include erythromycin, azithromycin, clarithromycin, or trimethoprim/sulfamethoxazole. Evidence to support interventions for the cough, other than antibiotics, is poor. About 50% of infected children less than a year old require hospitalization and nearly 0.5% (1 in 200) die.

An estimated 16.3 million people worldwide were infected in 2015. Most cases occur in the developing world, and people of all ages may be affected. In 2015, pertussis resulted in 58,700 deaths – down from 138,000 deaths in 1990. Outbreaks of the disease were first described in the 16th century. The bacterium that causes the infection was discovered in 1906. The pertussis vaccine became available in the 1940s.

Signs and symptoms

The classic symptoms of pertussis are a paroxysmal cough, inspiratory whoop, and fainting, or vomiting after coughing. The cough from pertussis has been documented to cause subconjunctival hemorrhages, rib fractures, urinary incontinence, hernias, and vertebral artery dissection. Violent coughing can cause the pleura to rupture, leading to a pneumothorax. Vomiting after a coughing spell or an inspiratory whooping sound on coughing, almost doubles the likelihood that the illness is pertussis. The absence of a paroxysmal cough or posttussive emesis, though, makes it almost half as likely.

The illness usually starts with mild respiratory symptoms include mild coughing, sneezing, or a runny nose (known as the catarrhal stage). After one or two weeks, the coughing classically develops into uncontrollable fits, sometimes followed by a high-pitched "whoop" sound, as the person tries to inhale. About 50% of children and adults "whoop" at some point in diagnosed pertussis cases during the paroxysmal stage.

This stage usually lasts two to eight weeks, or sometimes longer. A gradual transition then occurs to the convalescent stage, which usually lasts one to four weeks. This stage is marked by a decrease in paroxysms of coughing, although paroxysms may occur with subsequent respiratory infection for many months after the onset of pertussis.

Symptoms of pertussis can be variable, especially between immunized and non-immunized people. Those that are immunized can present with a more mild infection; they may only have the paroxysmal cough for a couple of weeks, and it may lack the "whooping" characteristic. Although immunized people have a milder form of the infection, they can spread the disease to others who are not immune.

Incubation period
The time between exposure and the development of symptoms is on average 7–14 days (range 6–20 days), rarely as long as 42 days.

Cause
Pertussis is caused by the bacterium Bordetella pertussis. It is an airborne disease (through droplets) that spreads easily through the coughs and sneezes of an infected person.

Spread from animals
Uncertainties have existed of B. pertussis and whooping cough as a zoonotic disease since around 1910, but in the 1930s knowledge was gained that the bacteria lost their virulent power when repeatedly spread on agar media. This explained the difficulties to reproduce results from different studies as the pre-inoculating handlings of the bacteria were not standardized among scientists.

Today it is established that at least some primate species are highly susceptible to B. pertussis and develop clinical whooping cough in high incidence when exposed to low inoculation doses. The bacteria may be present in wild animal populations, but this is not confirmed by laboratory diagnosis, although whooping cough is known among wild gorillas. Several zoos also have a long-standing custom of vaccinating their primates against whooping cough.

Mechanism
After the bacteria are inhaled, they initially adhere to the ciliated epithelium in the nasopharynx. Surface proteins of B. pertussis, including filamentous hemaglutinin and pertactin, mediate attachment to the epithelium. The bacteria then multiply. In infants, who experience more severe disease, the bacteria spread down to the lungs.

The bacteria secretes a number of toxins. Tracheal cytotoxin, a fragment of peptidoglycan, kills ciliated epithelial cells and thereby inhibits the mucociliary elevator by which mucus and debris are removed. TCT may contribute to the cough characteristic of pertussis. The cough may also be caused by a yet-to-be identified "cough toxin". Pertussis toxin causes lymphocytosis by an unknown mechanism. The elevated number of white blood cells leads to pulmonary hypertension, a major cause of death by pertussis. In infants who develop encephalopathy, cerebral hemorrhage and cortical atrophy occur, likely due to hypoxia.

Diagnosis

Based on symptoms
A physician's overall impression is most effective in initially making the diagnosis. Single factors are much less useful. In adults with a cough of less than 8 weeks, vomiting after coughing or a "whoop" is supportive. If there are no bouts of coughing or there is a fever the diagnosis is unlikely. In children who have a cough of less than 4 weeks vomiting after coughing is somewhat supportive but not definitive.

Lab tests
Methods used in laboratory diagnosis include culturing of nasopharyngeal swabs on a nutrient medium (Bordet–Gengou medium), polymerase chain reaction (PCR), direct fluorescent antibody (DFA), and serological methods (e.g. complement fixation test). The bacteria can be recovered from the person only during the first three weeks of illness, rendering culturing and DFA useless after this period, although PCR may have some limited usefulness for an additional three weeks.

Serology may be used for adults and adolescents who have already been infected for several weeks to determine whether antibody against pertussis toxin or another virulence factor of B. pertussis is present at high levels in the blood of the person.

Differential diagnosis
A similar, milder disease is caused by B. parapertussis.

Prevention
The primary method of prevention for pertussis is vaccination. Evidence is insufficient to determine the effectiveness of antibiotics in those who have been exposed, but are without symptoms. Preventive antibiotics, however, are still frequently used in those who have been exposed and are at high risk of severe disease (such as infants).

Vaccine 
Pertussis vaccines are effective at preventing illness and are recommended for routine use by the World Health Organization and the United States Centers for Disease Control and Prevention. The vaccine saved an estimated half a million lives in 2002.

The multicomponent acellular pertussis vaccine is 71–85% effective, with greater effectiveness against more severe strains. However, despite widespread vaccination, pertussis has persisted in vaccinated populations and is today "one of the most common vaccine-preventable diseases in Western countries". The 21st-century resurgences in pertussis infections is attributed to a combination of waning immunity and bacterial mutations that elude vaccines.

Immunization does not confer lifelong immunity; a 2011 CDC study indicated that protection may only last three to six years. This covers childhood, which is the time of greatest exposure and greatest risk of death from pertussis.

An effect of widespread immunization on society has been the shift of reported infections from children aged 1–9 years to infants, adolescents, and adults, with adolescents and adults acting as reservoirs for B. pertussis and infecting infants who have had fewer than three doses of vaccine.

Infection induces incomplete natural immunity that wanes over time. A 2005 study said estimates of the duration of infection-acquired immunity range from 7 to 20 years and the different results could be the result of differences in levels of circulating B. pertussis, surveillance systems, and case definitions used. The study said protective immunity after vaccination wanes after 4–12 years. One study suggested that the availability of vaccine exemptions increases the number of pertussis cases.

Some studies have suggested that while acellular pertussis vaccines are effective at preventing the disease, they have a limited impact on infection and transmission, meaning that vaccinated people could spread pertussis even though they may have only mild symptoms or none at all. Pertussis infection in these persons may be asymptomatic, or present as illness ranging from a mild cough to classic pertussis with persistent cough (i.e., lasting more than 7 days). Even though the disease may be milder in older persons, those who are infected may transmit the disease to other susceptible persons, including unimmunized or incompletely immunized infants. Older persons are often found to have the first case in a household with multiple pertussis cases, and are often the source of infection for children.

Treatment 

The antibiotics erythromycin, clarithromycin, or azithromycin are typically the recommended treatment. Newer macrolides are frequently recommended due to lower rates of side effects. Trimethoprim-sulfamethoxazole (TMP/SMX) may be used in those with allergies to first-line agents or in infants who have a risk of pyloric stenosis from macrolides.

A reasonable guideline is to treat people age >1 year within 3 weeks of cough onset and infants age <1 year and pregnant women within 6 weeks of cough onset. If the person is diagnosed late, antibiotics will not alter the course of the illness, and even without antibiotics, they should no longer be spreading pertussis. When used early, antibiotics decrease the duration of infectiousness, and thus prevent spread. Short-term antibiotics (azithromycin for 3–5 days) are as effective as long-term treatment (erythromycin 10–14 days) in eliminating B. pertussis with fewer and less severe side effects.

People with pertussis are most infectious during the first two weeks following the onset of symptoms.

Effective treatments of the cough associated with this condition have not been developed. The use of over the counter cough medications is discouraged and has not been found helpful.

Prognosis 

While most healthy older children and adults fully recover, infection in newborns is particularly severe. Pertussis is fatal in an estimated 0.5% of US infants under one year of age. First-year infants are also more likely to develop complications, such as: apneas (31%), pneumonia (12%), seizures (0.6%) and encephalopathy (0.15%). This may be due to the ability of the bacterium to suppress the immune system.

Epidemiology

Worldwide, whooping cough affects around 16 million people yearly. One estimate for 2013 stated it resulted in about 61,000 deaths – down from 138,000 deaths in 1990. Another estimated 195,000 child deaths yearly from the disease worldwide. This is despite generally high coverage with the DTP and DTaP vaccines. Pertussis is one of the leading causes of vaccine-preventable deaths worldwide. About 90% of all cases occur in developing countries.

Before vaccines, an average of 178,171 cases was reported in the U.S., with peaks reported every two to five years; more than 93% of reported cases occurred in children under 10 years of age. The actual incidence was likely much higher. After vaccinations were introduced in the 1940s, pertussis incidence fell dramatically to approximately 1,000 by 1976. Incidence rates have increased since 1980. In 2015, 20,762 people were reported to have been infected in the United States.

Pertussis is the only vaccine-preventable disease that is associated with increasing deaths in the U.S. The number of deaths increased from four in 1996 to 17 in 2001, almost all of which were infants under one year. In Canada, the number of pertussis infections has varied between 2,000 and 10,000 reported cases each year over the last ten years, and it is the most common vaccine-preventable illness in Toronto.

In 2009 Australia reported an average of 10,000 cases a year, and the number of cases had increased. In the U.S. pertussis in adults has increased significantly since about 2004.

In 2017, India had a reported 23,766 reported pertussis cases, making it one of the highest reported number of cases of the year. Other countries, such as Germany, had reported 16,183 cases, while Australia and China had a reported number of 12,114 and 10,390 pertussis cases.

US outbreaks

In 2010, 10 babies in California died and health authorities declared an epidemic with 5,978 confirmed, probable and suspected cases. They found that doctors had failed to correctly diagnose the babies' condition during several visits. Statistical analysis identified significant overlap in communities with a cluster of nonmedical child exemptions and cases. The number of exemptions varied widely among communities, but tended to be highly clustered. In some schools, more than 75 % of parents filed for vaccination exemptions. The data suggest vaccine refusal based on nonmedical reasons and personal belief exacerbated the outbreak. Other factors included reduced duration of immunity following the acellular vaccine and most vaccinated adults and older children not receiving a booster shot.

In April and May 2012, pertussis was declared to be at epidemic levels in Washington, with 3,308 cases. In December 2012 Vermont declared an epidemic of 522 cases. Wisconsin had the highest incidence rate, with 3,877 cases, although it did not make an official epidemic declaration.

History

Discovery 
B. pertussis was discovered in 1906 by Jules Bordet and Octave Gengou, who also developed the first serology and vaccine. Efforts to develop an inactivated whole-cell vaccine began soon after B. pertussis was cultured that year. In the 1920s, Louis W. Sauer developed a weak vaccine for whooping cough at Evanston Hospital (Evanston, IL). In 1925 Danish physician Thorvald Madsen was the first to test a whole-cell vaccine on a wide scale. Madsen used the vaccine to control outbreaks in the Faroe Islands in the North Sea.

Vaccine 
In 1932 an outbreak of whooping cough hit Atlanta, Georgia, prompting pediatrician Leila Denmark to begin her study of the disease. Over the next six years her work was published in the Journal of the American Medical Association, and in partnership with Emory University and Eli Lilly & Company, she developed the first pertussis vaccine. In 1942 American scientists Grace Eldering, Loney Gordon, and Pearl Kendrick combined the whole-cell pertussis vaccine with diphtheria and tetanus toxoids to generate the first DTP combination vaccine. To minimize the frequent side effects caused by the pertussis component, Japanese scientist Yuji Sato developed an acellular vaccine consisting of purified haemagglutinins (HAs: filamentous strep throat and leukocytosis-promoting-factor HA), which are secreted by B. pertussis. Sato's acellular pertussis vaccine was used in Japan starting in 1981. Later versions of the acellular vaccine in other countries consisted of additional defined components of B. pertussis and were often part of the DTaP combination vaccine.

References

External links 

 Pertussis at Todar's Online Textbook of Bacteriology
 PBS NOVA – Vaccines: Calling The Shots
 

 
Bacterial diseases
Pediatrics
Articles containing video clips
Wikipedia medicine articles ready to translate
Disorders causing seizures
Wikipedia emergency medicine articles ready to translate
Vaccine-preventable diseases